Leesthorpe is a hamlet in the civil parish of Somerby, in the Melton district, in the English county of Leicestershire.

Leesthorpe is located in the north east of the county close to the Rutland border and just south of the A606 Melton Mowbray and Oakham road.

History 
Leesthorpe was recorded in the Domesday Book as Luvestorp.

Until 1 April 1936 it was in the civil parish of Pickwell with Leesthorpe.

References 

Villages in Leicestershire
Somerby, Leicestershire